10 Day is the debut mixtape by American rapper Chance the Rapper. It was released independently on April 3, 2012 as a free digital download. The mixtape was downloaded over 400,000 times on mixtape site DatPiff, and over 235,000 times on MixtapeMonkey. 10 Day was released on commercial streaming platforms in June 2019, followed by a vinyl release.

Background and Production

Background 
Following a 10-day suspension in 2011 for possessing marijuana on his high school campus, Bennett recorded his first full-length project, called 10 Day. Prior to the mixtape, he was highlighted as one of Complex magazine's "10 New Chicago Rappers to Watch Out For." The mixtape features guest appearances from Vic Mensa, Sulaiman, and Nico Segal. The mixtape also includes production from Peter Cottontale, Chuck Inglish, Blended Babies, DJ SuchNSuch, MF Love, Flying Lotus, THEMPeople, Caleb James, Lex Luger. The mixtape would also garner the attention of Forbes magazine, as it was featured in the publication's Cheap Tunes column.

Cover Art 
The cover art to the mixtape shows a realistic cartoon drawing of Chance in a red jacket looking up to a sky full of clouds, with stylized, comic book looking text that reads "Chance the Rapper" and "10 DAY" in bold red letters above Chance. The artwork was done by Chicago artist Brandon Breaux, and was the first of many collaborations for the two, as Breaux also did the cover art for the two following mixtapes, Acid Rap and Coloring Book. Breaux also worked on the artwork for Chance's 2018 singles "Wala Cam", "65th and Ingleside" and "Work Out".

Sampling 
The song "Long Time" features a sample from the song "Nantes" by Beirut, originally released in 2007 and featured on their album "The Flying Club Car." Additionally, the track "Prom Night" features a sample from the 1979 song "So Good, So Right" by Brenda Russell, and "Family" samples the 1977 track "You're Not Fooling Me" by the band Angel.

Reception 
While reviews of 10 Day upon its initial release were scarce, the mixtape has since received recognition for being what launched the now superstar Chance the Rapper into fame. On the music site 'The West Review', critic Joe Stevens described the mixtape as a "notably creative piece of music."

Merchandise 
 Following the success of the mixtape, Chance put out a line of apparel and products all marked with the 10 Day logo. The items include long sleeve and short sleeve shirts, crewnecks, basketball shorts, a lighter and a vinyl copy of the mixtape. All of these products can be purchased on his website, chanceraps.com, and a digital edition of the mixtape is included with every purchase made.

Track listing
Credits adapted from Tidal.

Notes
 "Windows" contains an uncredited sample of "Bridge Through Time" by Lonnie Liston Smith; the song was not included on the commercial streaming re-release for over 48 hours before being added to the commercial release.

Charts

References

External links
 
10 Day at MixtapeMonkey

2012 mixtape albums
Chance the Rapper albums
Debut mixtape albums